Imelda "Mel" Tobias Aguilar (born October 31, 1946) is a Filipina politician who currently serves as mayor of Las Piñas since 2016, previously holding this position from 2004 until 2007.

Aguilar was married to former mayor Vergel Aguilar; they have four children. Their daughter, April Aguilar-Nery, serves as her vice mayor of this city since 2019. On August 20, 2021, Vergel Aguilar died at the age of 74.

References

1946 births
Living people
Nacionalista Party politicians
21st-century Filipino women politicians
21st-century Filipino politicians
Mayors of Las Piñas